Carlos Moyá was the defending champion, but lost in the second round to Mariano Puerta.

Rafael Nadal won in the final 6–1, 6–0, against Albert Montañés.

Seeds

Draw

Finals

Top half

Bottom half

Qualifying

Seeds

Qualifiers

Qualifying draw

First qualifier

Second qualifier

Third qualifier

Fourth qualifier

References

External links
 Main Draw (ATP)
 Qualifying Draw (ATP)
 Tournament profile (ITF)

2005 Abierto Mexicano Telcel
Abierto Mexicano Telcel